"Hey Little Cobra" is a song released in 1963 by The Rip Chords about the Shelby Cobra. The song was produced by Terry Melcher and Bruce Johnston, who also sang vocals.

The song spent 14 weeks on the Billboard Hot 100 chart, peaking at No. 4, while reaching No. 5 on Canada's CHUM Hit Parade and No. 3 on New Zealand's "Lever Hit Parade".

Personnel
According to the AFM contract, the following musicians played on the track.

Steve Douglas
Glen Campbell
Ray Pohlman
Leon Russell
Frank Capp
Hal Blaine
Bill Pitman
Tommy Tedesco

Chart performance

References

1963 songs
1963 singles
Columbia Records singles
Songs written by Carol Connors (singer)
Song recordings produced by Bruce Johnston
Song recordings produced by Terry Melcher